Paula Jensen (née Mikkelsen; born 28 September 1980) is a Faroese former footballer who played as a right back. She has been a member of the Faroe Islands women's national team.

References

1980 births
Living people
Women's association football fullbacks
Faroese women's footballers
Faroe Islands women's international footballers
Faroese people of Asian descent